Saudin Huseinović (Serbian Cyrillic: Саудин Хусеиновић; born 19 December 1971) Is a Serbian-Bosniak former footballer.

Career
After playing for several seasons with his birth town club FK Novi Pazar, he moved to top league clubs FK Borac Čačak and FK Rad. Remembered as a skillful striker, he moved in 2000 to Slovenia where he played two seasons with FC Koper and half with NK Korotan Prevalje. He finished his playing career playing back with FK Novi Pazar.

External sources
 Profile at Srbijafudbal
 Stats from Slovenia at PrvaLiga 

Living people
1971 births
Sportspeople from Novi Pazar
Bosniaks of Serbia
Serbian footballers
FK Novi Pazar players
FK Borac Čačak players
FK Rad players
FC Koper players
Slovenian PrvaLiga players
Expatriate footballers in Slovenia
Association football forwards